Marchione is an Italian surname. Notable people with the surname include:

Carlo Marchione (born 1964), Italian classical guitarist
Frankie Marchione (born 1983), American  YouTuber and television host
Kathy Marchione (born c. 1955), American politician
Margherita Marchione (1922–2021), American Roman Catholic nun, writer, teacher and apologetic

See also
Marchioni
Marchione Guitars, an American guitar manufacturing company

Italian-language surnames